The 2009 Indian general election in Jammu and Kashmir to the 15th Lok Sabha were held for 6 seats. Jammu and Kashmir National Conference won 3 seats. Indian National Congress won 2 and one was won by an Independent politician Hassan Khan.

Results

Party-wise Results

List of Elected MPs

See also
 Results of the 2009 Indian general election by state
 Elections in Jammu and Kashmir

Jammu
Indian general elections in Jammu and Kashmir
2000s in Jammu and Kashmir